The year 1715 in music involved some significant events.

Events 
September – Presumed staging of first Three Choirs Festival in England.
Comédie en vaudeville is staged for the first time in Paris.
Francesco Geminiani performs at the court of King George I of Great Britain, accompanied by Handel.

Classical music 
Tomaso Albinoni – 12 Concerti a cinque, Op. 7
Johann Sebastian Bach
Der Himmel lacht! die Erde jubiliert, BWV 31
Bereitet die Wege, bereitet die Bahn, BWV 132
Nur jedem das Seine, BWV 163
Ach! ich sehe, itzt, da ich zur Hochzeit gehe, BWV 162
O heilges Geist- und Wasserbad, BWV 165
Barmherziges Herze der ewigen Liebe, BWV 185
Valet will ich dir geben, BWV 736
English Suites (speculated year of composition) BWV 806–811
Suite in F minor, BWV 823
Prelude and Fugue in A minor, BWV 894
Fugue in A major, BWV 949
 Francesco Antonio Bonporti – Concerti a quattro, Op. 11
 Antonio Caldara – Motetti a due e tre voci, Op. 4
François Couperin 
George Frideric Handel  
Brockes-Passion, HWV 48
Concerto Grosso in B-flat major, HWV 313
Concerto Grosso in D minor, HWV 316
Concerto Grosso in D major, HWV 317
Jacques Hotteterre – Pièces pour la flûte traversiere, Op. 5
Elisabeth Jacquet de la Guerre – Cantates Françoises, Livre 3
Jean-Baptiste Loeillet – 12 Recorder Sonatas, Op. 3
Alessandro Marcello – Oboe Concerto in D minor, S.Z799
Gaetano Meneghetti – Violin Concerto in A major
James Paisible – The Friendship, Mr. Isaac's new dance for the year 1715...
Jean-Philippe Rameau – Thétis, RCT 28
Johann Ernst Prinz von Sachsen-Weimar – Violin Concerto in G major
Alessandro Scarlatti 
Sinfonie di concerto grosso
Stabat Mater.
 Johann Christian Schickhardt – 6 Concertos for 4 Recorders and Continuo, Op. 19
 Georg Philipp Telemann  
 6 Sonates à violon seul accompagné par le clavessin
 Sonata à 4, TWV 43:a5
 Carlo Tessarini – 12 Concerti a cinque, Op. 1
 Antonio Vivaldi 
 Violin Concerto in A major, RV 345
 Violin Concerto in B-flat major, RV 363
John Walsh (pub.) – The Bird Fancyer's Delight
Jan Dismas Zelenka – Capriccio in D major, ZWV 182

Opera
Giovanni Bononcini – Astarto
George Frideric Handel – Amadigi di Gaula
Johann Augustin Kobelius – Der unschuldig verdammte Heinrich, Fürst von Wallis
Giuseppe Maria Orlandini – Bacocco e Serpilla
Alessandro Scarlatti – Il Tigrane
Domenico Scarlatti – La Dirindina
Antonio Vivaldi – Nerone Fatto Cesare

Births 
January 12 – Jacques Duphly, composer (died 1789)
January 29 – Georg Christoph Wagenseil, composer (died 1777)
April 11 – John Alcock, composer
April 19 – James Nares, composer (died 1783)
April 23 – Johann Friedrich Doles, composer (died 1797)
April 28 – Franz Sparry, composer (died 1767)
May 11
Johann Gottfried Bernhard Bach, organist and son of Johann Sebastian Bach (died 1739)
Ignazio Fiorillo, composer (died 1787)
November 10 – Johann August Landvoigt, librettist and musician (died 1766)
November 16 – Girolamo Abos, composer (died 1760)
December – Isabella Lampe, soprano and wife of John Frederick Lampe (died 1795)
December 12 – Gennaro Manna, composer (died 1779)
date unknown
Giovanni Battista Casali, musician (died 1792)
William Felton – (died 1769)
Francesco Zoppis, composer (died after 1781)

Deaths 
January 15 – Caspar Neumann, hymnist (born 1648)
January 22 – Marc'Antonio Ziani, composer (born c.1653)
February 3 – Gottfried Vopelius, composer
July 30 – Nahum Tate, hymn-writer and lyricist (born 1652)
September 2 – Constantin Christian Dedekind, composer
September 6 – Basilius Petritz, German composer and Kreuzkantor in Dresden (born 1647)
October 6 – Melchior Hoffmann, composer 
date unknown
Antonio de Salazar, composer (born c.1650)
Diego Xaraba, Spanish organist and composer (born 1652)
probable
Daniel Eberlin, composer (born 1647)
Vasily Polikarpovich Titov, Russian composer

References

 
18th century in music
Music by year